The 1895 Indiana Hoosiers football team was an American football team that represented Indiana University Bloomington during the 1895 college football season. Prior to 1895, Indiana had fielded a football team in seven seasons and had yet to win an intercollegiate football game. For the 1895 season, Indiana hired former Harvard quarterback and national tennis champion Robert Wrenn to coach its football team.

Schedule

References

Indiana
Indiana Hoosiers football seasons
Indiana Hoosiers football